Walter is a British television crime drama film, written by Kevin Lygo under the pseudonym Ruby Solomon, that first broadcast on BBC One on 8 August 2014. Intended as a "backdoor pilot" for a potential series, Walter stars Adrian Dunbar as the title character, a detective inspector assigned to investigate the unsolved cases of a former colleague who met his death after falling in front of a tube train. Assisted by an eager new recruit, Anne Hopkins (Alexandra Roach) and his dim-yet-trusty sidekick Mike Minorsky (Kayvan Novak), Walter investigates whether his former colleague's death may have in fact been murder.

Described as a "comedy drama", with comparisons to fellow BBC stablemate New Tricks, the film was met with a number of negative reviews, including the Herald Scotland, whose writer described it as "the worst thing I've seen on TV this year." The film pulled in less than 3.34 million viewers, and was ranked outside the Top 30 programmes for that week.

Cast
 Adrian Dunbar as DI Walter Gambon
 Alexandra Roach as DC Anne Hopkins
 Kayvan Novak as DS Mike Minorsky
 Harry Hadden-Paton as CS Charles Addison
 Gerard Horan as DS Geoffrey Pollard
 Richie Campbell as DC Noel Kress
 Sophie Stanton as DS Jennifer Simms
 Chris Brailsford as DI Rod Romney
 Danny Erskine	as DC Lenny Rice
 Pip Torrens as Commander Angus Thomas

Production
The film was commissioned by then BBC director of television Danny Cohen, comedy commissioning controller Shane Allen and BBC One controller Charlotte Moore.

Kevin Lygo scripted the film under the pseudonym Ruby Solomon. He told The Guardian that this was "to avoid any potential conflict of interest, because it was to be made by ITV Studios, and also partly because I'm naturally a bit mischievous". Lygo added that "he wrote it at weekends" and that it was "somewhere between New Tricks and Minder". His daughter Madison also stars in the film.

References

External links
 

2014 television films
2014 films
British television films
2010s English-language films